Ethem Necdet Karabudak (1882 in Çal – July 13, 1946 in Denizli) was an officer of the Ottoman Army and of the Turkish Army.

Medals and decorations
Gallipoli Star (Ottoman Empire)
Silver Medal of Liyakat 
Medal of Independence with Red Ribbon and Citation

See also
List of high-ranking commanders of the Turkish War of Independence

Sources

1882 births
1946 deaths
People from Çal
Ottoman Military Academy alumni
Ottoman Military College alumni
Ottoman Army officers
Ottoman military personnel of the Balkan Wars
Ottoman military personnel of World War I
Ottoman prisoners of war
World War I prisoners of war held by the United Kingdom
Turkish Army officers
Turkish military personnel of the Franco-Turkish War
Turkish military personnel of the Greco-Turkish War (1919–1922)
Recipients of the Liakat Medal
Recipients of the Medal of Independence with Red Ribbon (Turkey)